J.C. Politz (1924-2006) was an American sportscaster best known for calling games for the Southern Jaguars football team, LSU Tigers basketball and football teams and St. Louis Cardinals (NFL). He also called games for the Tulane Green Wave, Southeastern Louisiana Lions, Southern Mississippi Golden Eagles, New Mexico Lobos and New Orleans Privateers.

Biography
J.C. Politz was born in December 2, 1924 in Napoleonville, Louisiana. He was a gunner on a B-24 flying over Europe in World War II. After the war, he attended Louisiana State University and graduated in 1953. He worked at several radio stations and WBRZ-TV in Baton Rouge, Louisiana. His first job calling games was with the Southern Jaguars in the mid-1950s. After the 1958 season, John Ferguson left LSU and Politz was hired for the 1959 football season to broadcast LSU football and men's basketball. During the 1959 football season, Politz called what could arguably be one of the more memorable plays in college football history. He was the radio announcer during Billy Cannon's Halloween run versus Ole Miss. Politz remained at LSU through the 1960 season before John Ferguson returned for 1961.

After leaving LSU, Politz spent three years calling St. Louis Cardinals (NFL) football games for KMOX-AM before returning to Baton Rouge. He called games for the Tulane Green Wave, Southeastern Louisiana Lions, Southern Mississippi Golden Eagles, New Mexico Lobos and New Orleans Privateers. He returned to Southern University in the 1990s and called his final game on November 30, 2002 in the Bayou Classic.

Politz died in 2006 at the age of 81 in Baton Rouge, Louisiana.

See also
LSU Sports Network

References

1924 births
2006 deaths
National Football League announcers
American radio sports announcers
College basketball announcers in the United States
College football announcers
Louisiana State University alumni
LSU Tigers basketball announcers
LSU Tigers football announcers
St. Louis Cardinals (football) announcers
Southern Jaguars football